Jeddah Economic Forum (JEF) is a forum held annually since 1999 during winter in the city of Jeddah, western Saudi Arabia. It has become the region's Middle East strategic think tank focusing on regional and international economic and social issues. The Jeddah Economic Forum is organized by the Jeddah Marketing Board, which is a part of Jeddah Chamber of Commerce & Industry.

It is also organized in association with Ernst & Young as a Strategic Knowledge Advisors partner. The current president of the forum is Shiekh Saleh Kamel. The forum was founded by Amr Dabbagh.

The forum has invited well-known speakers at the event such as George H. W. Bush, John Major, Bill Clinton, Gerhard Schroeder the former German chancellor, Madeleine Albright, Al-Waleed bin Talal, Queen Rania of Jordan, Recep Tayyip Erdoğan Prime Minister of Turkey, Rafik Hariri Post Prime Minister of Lebanon, Mahathir Mohamad Prime Minister of Malaysia, and Lubna Olayan, Hillary Clinton, Klaus Schwab, Hayat Sindi and Princess Victoria Ingrid.

Speakers by year
The following have been speakers at the JEF.

2000
  former UK Prime Minister John Major.
  former US president George H. W. Bush.
  Richard N. Cooper, Professor of Economics, Harvard University.
  Louis T. Wells, Professor of Economics, Harvard University.
  Roger B. Porter, IBM Professor at the John F. Kennedy School of Government.

2001
  Valéry Giscard d'Estaing, former President of France.
  Helmut Kohl, former Chancellor of Germany.
  Amr Dabbagh, Professor of Economics, KAU. Chairman of JEF, member of the World Economic Forum.
  Prince Abdul Majeed bin Abdulaziz, then Governor of Makkah Region.
  Prince Abdullah bin Faisal bin Turki, then Governor of Saudi Arabian General Investment Authority.
  Fawaz al Alami, former Minister of Commerce of Saudi Arabia.
  John Quelch, Dean of London Business School.

2002
  Salman bin Hamad bin Isa Al Khalifa, Crown Prince of Bahrain.
  Prince Al-Waleed, World 8th Richest person.
  Sultan bin Salman bin Abdulaziz, Governor of Council of Tourism of Saudi Arabia.
  Iyad Madani, former Minister of Hajj of Saudi Arabia.
  Hashim Abdullah Yamani, Minister of Electricity and Industry of Saudi Arabia.
  Osama Fakieh, Minister of Commerce of Saudi Arabia.
  Mohammed Abdou Yamani, former Minister of Information of Saudi Arabia.
  Mohammed Sabban, Advisor to the Ministry of Petroleum & Minerals.
  Amr Dabbagh, Professor of Economics, KAU. Chairman of JEF, member of the World Economic Forum.
  former US president Bill Clinton.
  Neil Bush, son of president George H. W. Bush.

2004
  Queen Rania of Jordan.
  President Nursultan Nazarbayev of Kazakhstan.
  Kassym-Jomart Tokayev, Foreign Minister of Kazakhstan.
  Rafik Hariri, former Prime Minister of Lebanon.
  Fouad Siniora, Prime Minister of Lebanon.
  Mahathir bin Mohamad, former Prime Minister of Malaysia.
  Shaukat Aziz, Prime Minister of Pakistan.
  Lubna Olayan, famous Saudi business woman.
  Crown Princess of Sweden Victoria Ingrid.
  Gunnar Lund, Minister of International Economic Affairs & Financial Markets of Sweden.
  Recep Tayyip Erdoğan, Prime Minister of Turkey.
  Mohamed Alabbar, Director General Department of Economy Dubai.
  former US president Bill Clinton.

2005
  Hamid Karzai, President of Afghanistan.
  Tayeb Laouh, Minister of Labour & Social Affairs of Algeria.
  Deisi Kusztra, President of World Family Organization.
  Celso Amorim, Minister of Foreign Relations of Brazil.
  Ta-lin Hsu, Chairman H&Q Asia Pacific.
  Václav Klaus, President of Czech Republic.
  Rachid Mohamed Rachid, Minister of Foreign Trade & Industry of Egypt.
  Amr Moussa, Secretary General of the Arab League.
  Faiza Abou el-Naga, Minister of International Cooperation of Egypt.
  Ahmed El Maghrabi, Minister of Tourism of Egypt.
  Francesco Frangialli, Secretary General, World Tourism Organization.
  Abdullah Ahmad Badawi, Prime Minister of Malaysia
  Shaukat Aziz, Prime Minister of Pakistan.
  Haifa Jamalallail, Dean of Effat College.
  Suhair Al-Qurashi, Dean of Dar Al-Hekma College.
  Hashim Abdullah Yamani, Minister of Commerce and Industry of Saudi Arabia.
  Ghazi Al-Gosaibi, Saudi Minister of Labour .
  Ahmed Ali Mohammad, former President of Islamic Development Bank.
  Abdullah Al-Moallami, Mayor of Jeddah.
  Prince Amr Al-Faisal, famous Saudi business man.
  Hayat Sindi, Saudi Biotechnology Consultant & Inventor in England .
  Abdoulaye Wade, President of Senegal.
  Goh Chok Tong, Prime Minister of Singapore.
  Celia de Anca, Director of Centre for Diversity in Global Management in Spain.
  Klaus Schwab, Founder & Executive Chairman of World Economic Forum.
  Nibras El-Fadel, Economic Advisor to the President of Syria
  Mohamed Al Abbar, Director General Department of Economy Dubai.
  Madeleine K. Albright, Foreign Minister of the United States
  Zbigniew Brzezinski, former National Security Advisor.
  Adib Kanafani, Cahill Professor of Civil Engineering University of California.
  Jay Keasling, Professor of Chemical Engineering and Bioengineering at the University of California.
  Joe Klein, famous columnist in TIME Magazine
  Donald A. McQuade, Vice Chancellor, University Relations, University of California.
  Jamil Mrouie, publisher in The Daily Star.
  Christiaan Poortman, Vice President, Middle East and North Africa Region, World Bank.
  Tom Ridge, former Secretary of Homeland Security .
  Clark Winter, Chief Global Investment Strategist, The Citigroup Private Bank.

2006
  Deisi Kusztra, President of World Family Organization.
  Henri Djombo, Minister of Environment & Forestry Economy of Democratic Republic of the Congo.
  Amr Moussa, Secretary General of the Arab League.
  Clara Gaymard, Ambassador at Large, President, Agence Francaise pour les Investissements Internationaux - AF.I.I.
  Rainer Geiger, Deputy Director of Organisation for Economic Co-operation and Development.
  Gerhard Schröder, Former Chancellor of Germany.
  Jerry Rawlings, Former President of Ghana.
  Ali Reza Attar, Deputy Foreign Minister on Economic Affairs of Iran.
  Mary McAleese, President of Ireland.
  Abdelsalam al-Majali, Former Prime Minister of Jordan.
  Yousef Al-Ibrahim, Advisor to the Prince of Kuwait & Ex-Minister of Finance.
  Anwar Ibrahim, Former Deputy Prime Minister of Malaysia.
  Doku Zavgayev, Director General of Ministry of Foreign Affairs of Russia.
  Abdullah Al-Muallimi, Mayor of Jeddah.
  Ahmed Ali Mohammad, former President of Islamic Development Bank.
  Amr Dabbagh, Professor of Economics, King Abdulaziz University. Chairman of JEF, member of the World Economic Forum.
  Haifa Jamalallail, Dean of Effat College.
  Hussein Shobokshi, famous Saudi TV interviewer of Business programmes.
  Lim Hng Kiang, Prime Minister of Singapore.
  Harsha V. Singh, Deputy Director-General of World Trade Organization (WTO).
  Saida Agrebi, Vice President of World Family Organization.
  Abdullah Gül, Deputy Prime Minister & Minister of Foreign Affairs of Turkey.
  Mohamed Al Abbar, Director General Department of Economy Dubai.
  David William Brewer, Lord Mayor of London .
  Carma Elliot, British Consul General in Jeddah.
  Albert Arnold Gore, former Vice President of the United States.
  John Anwyl, President of Anwyl International Development Group .
  George Billiard, Network 20/20.
  Steve Forbes, President & CEO of Forbes Inc.
  Kristina M. Johnson, Dean of Pratt School of Engineering, Duke University.
  Christiaan Poortman, Vice President, Middle East and North Africa Region, World Bank.
  Ian Bremmer, President of Eurasia Group.
  Albert Beckford Jones, Senior Advisor to the President of the U.S. Civilian Research & Development Foundation (CRDF)

2007
  Jean Chrétien, former Prime Minister of Canada.
  Liu Jian Feng, Chinese minister.
  Emma Bonino, Italian Trade Minister .
  Queen Rania of Jordan.
  Luc Frieden, Minister for Justice in Luxembourg.
  Abdullah Ahmad Badawi, Prime Minister of Malaysia.
  Lech Wałęsa, former President of Poland.
  Turki bin Faisal Al Saud, former Saudi ambassador in United Kingdom & Ireland & United States.
  Hashim Abdullah Yamani, Minister of Commerce and Industry of Saudi Arabia.
  Recep Tayyip Erdoğan, Prime Minister of Turkey.
  Sue MacGregor, British writer and broadcaster in BBC.
  Alastair Stewart, British television newsreader.
  Peter Mandelson, European Commissioner.
  Wesley Clark, former Commander of NATO.

2008
  Haris Silajdžić, member of the Presidency of Bosnia and Herzegovina and former Prime Minister.
  Salam Fayyad, Prime Minister of Palestine.
  Prince Turki bin Faisal Al Saud, former Saudi ambassador to the United Kingdom, Ireland and the United States.

2012
  Prince Khalid Al-Faisal, Governor Makkah Region.
  Prince Turki bin Saud bin Mohammed Al Saud, Vice-president, Research institutes King Abdulaziz City for Science and Technology.
  Tawfiq Al Rabiah, Minister of Commerce and Industry.
  Adel M. Fakeih, Minister of Labour.
  Sheikh Saleh Abdullah Kamel, Chairman Jeddah Chamber of Commerce and Industry.
  Hani khoja, Managing Partner Elixir Business Consultancy.
  Abdulaziz Sager, Governor Makkah Region.
  Muhamad Noor, Ambassador, Executive Director APEC Secretariat.
  Gerhard Bosch, Director Institute for Work, Skills & Training (IAQ) at Duisburg-Essen University.
  Shaukat Aziz, Former Prime Minister.

2013
  Erdoğan Bayraktar Turkish Minister of Environment and Urbanization, Republic of Turkey.
  Ahmet Misbah Demircan Mayor of Beyoğlu, Republic of Turkey.
  Arnaud Montebourg Minister of Industrial Renewal, French Republic.
  Syed Mustafa Kamal Former Mayer of Karachi, Islamic Republic of Pakistan.
  Tawfig Fawzan Al-Rabiah Minister of Commerce and Industry, KSA.
  Showaish Al-Duwaihi Minister of Housing, KSA.
  Muhammed Al-Jasser Minister of economy and planning, KSA.
  Jaime Lerner Former Governor The state of Paraná in Southern Federative Republic of Brazil.
  Shahida Faraj Bouraoui Minister of Housing, Republic of Tunisia.
  Anita Arjundas CEO, Real Estate Sector and Managing Director - Mahindra Lifespace Developers, Republic of India.
  Shiekh Saleh Kamel Chairman – JCCI, KSA.
  Said Al-Shaikh Chief Economist- National Commercial Bank, KSA.

2014
  Prince Mishaal bin Abdullah Al Saud, Kingdom of Saudi Arabia.
  Dr. Tawfig Fawzan Al-Rabiah, Kingdom of Saudi Arabia.
  Dr. Muhammad Al Jasser, Kingdom of Saudi Arabia.
  Mr. Ibrahim Al Moiquel, Kingdom of Saudi Arabia.
  Sheikh Saleh Abdullah Kamel, Chairman – JCCI, Saudi Arabia.
  Dr. Lama Al Suleiman, Board Member - JCCI, Saudi Arabia.
  Dr. Boutros Klink, KSA CEO - Standard Chartered plc, Republic of Lebanon.
  Prof. Xavier Sala-i-Martin, Spain.
  Mr. Arnaud Montebourg, Former Managing Director of the World Economic Forum, Switzerland.
  Mr. Andrew Cleaves, IDD National Express Board Director Lead for Transport, U.K.
  Mr. Mohinder Singh Dean, LTA Academy Land Transport Authority Singapore, Singapore.
  Mr.Gregoire Sentilhes, President of Citizen Entrepreneurs, France.
  LIM Boon Tiong, General Manager ITES, Singapore.

2016
  Prince Khalid bin Faisal Al Saud, Kingdom of Saudi Arabia.
  Mr. Najib Razak, Prime Minister of Malaysia.
  Mr. Mehmet Şimşek, Deputy Prime Minister of Turkey.
  Dr. Tawfiq Al Rabiah, Kingdom of Saudi Arabia.
  Sheikh Saleh Abdullah Kamel, Chairman – JCCI, Saudi Arabia.
  Dr. Kadir Topbaş, Mayor of Istanbul, Turkey.

2018
  Prince Khalid bin Faisal Al Saud, Kingdom of Saudi Arabia t.b.c.

See also

 World Economic Forum
 Jeddah Chamber of Commerce & Industry
 Jeddah Marketing Board
 Jeddah

References

External links
 JEF official website 
 business.maktoob.com
 international-confex.com
 Arab News
 Prime NewsWire
 securingamerica.com
 AmeInfo

1999 establishments in Saudi Arabia
Recurring events established in 1999
Organizations established in 1999
Business organisations based in Saudi Arabia
Political and economic think tanks based in Asia
Organisations based in Jeddah
Economy of Saudi Arabia
History of Jeddah